Josiah Thomas (27 August 1910 – 28 May 1960) was an Australian cricketer. He played eight first-class cricket matches for Victoria between 1929 and 1933.

See also
 List of Victoria first-class cricketers

References

External links
 

1910 births
1960 deaths
Australian cricketers
Victoria cricketers
Sportspeople from Bendigo